Girls S-Cup is an annual women's kickboxing tournament promoted by Takeshi Caesar's Shoot Boxing Association and competed under shoot boxing rules. The tournament format is the 8-woman single elimination. Caesar Gym star Rena Kubota has dominated the tournament since its inauguration in 2009.

Shoot Boxing Girls Tournament 2009

Shoot Boxing Girls Tournament 2009 or Girls S-Cup 2009 was the event that featured the first of Girls S-Cup tournaments. The event was promoted by the Shoot Boxing Association and JEWELS MMA promotion. 
It was competed in the 52 kg weight class, also featuring a 57 kg opening match and the semi final for the Shoot Boxing women's open weight tournament. The event also featured an MMA match under co-promoter JEWELS' rules. 

Retired mixed martial artist and kickboxer Hisae Watanabe declined to participate in the tournament due to an injury and instead faced Megumi Fujii at an exhibition match under "mixed" shoot boxing and JEWELS rules.

Shoot Boxing World Tournament Girls S-Cup 2010

Shoot Boxing World Tournament Girls S-Cup 2010 was the event that featured the second of Girls S-Cup tournaments. The event was promoted by the Shoot Boxing Association and JEWELS. 
It was competed in the 51 kg weight class, also featuring a 54 kg opening match, one exhibition match between Nanae Takahashi and Fuka Kakimoto, and a 59 kg match. The event also featured an MMA match under co-promoter JEWELS' rules. 

Two special rules children's bouts under Fuka's management were presented, one of which showcased later puroresu prodigy Haruka.

Shoot Boxing World Tournament Girls S-Cup 2011

Shoot Boxing World Tournament Girls S-Cup 2011 was the event that featured the third of Girls S-Cup tournaments. The event was promoted by the Shoot Boxing Association. 
It was competed in the 51 kg weight class, also featuring a 48 kg opening match, one 70 kg and one 50 kg "Super Fight". 

Former champion Rena Kubota did not participate in the tournament and instead faced Muay Thai practitioner Zaza Sor. Aree in the 50 kg "Super Fight". Former runner-up Ai Takahashi failed to participate due to an injury.

Shoot Boxing World Tournament Girls S-Cup 2012

Shoot Boxing World Tournament Girls S-Cup 2012 was the event that featured the fourth of Girls S-Cup tournaments. The event was promoted by the Shoot Boxing Association. 
It was competed in the 50 kg weight class, also featuring a bantamweight single match and two additional tournaments: 53.5 kg Girls S-Cup won by Mizuki Inoue and JKS (JoshiKouSei) 48 won by Mio Tsumura alias "Mio Kubota".

References

Shoot boxing events
Kickboxing events
2009 in kickboxing
2010 in kickboxing
2011 in kickboxing
2012 in kickboxing
Kickboxing in Japan
Sports competitions in Tokyo

ja:SHOOT BOXING GIRLS TOURNAMENT Girls S-cup 2009